Canna patens is a species of herb in the Cannaceae family.

Description 
Small sized with spreading habit and thick rhizomes (these up to 3 cm in diameter). Green ovate leaves; green triangular stems; upright spikes with flowers of yellow petals with a wide red margin; staminodes are long and narrow, edges regular; capsules globose.

Taxonomy
Paul Maas and Nobuyuki Tanaka, both experts on the genus Canna have different opinions regarding this species. Maas considers C. patens a synonym of C. indica, but Tanaka considers it a distinct and separate species according to DNA analysis.

See also
 Canna
 List of Canna species
 List of Canna cultivars

References
 Cooke, Ian, 2001. The Gardener's Guide to Growing cannas, Timber Press. 
 Tanaka, N. 2001. Taxonomic revision of the family Cannaceae in the New World and Asia. Makinoa ser. 2, 1:34–43.

External links
 Canna patens in the Claines Canna Collection

patens